Date palm farming in Rajasthan was started in 2007.  Rajasthan grows date palm varieties like Barhee, Khuneji, Khalas, Medjool, Khadravi, Jamli and Sagai. India imports 38% of world's production of Date palm. Rajasthan produced nearly 800 tonnes of date palm from the first harvest in 2015–16.

See also 
 Atul (company)
 Date palm farming in Gujarat
Agriculture in India

References

Agriculture in Rajasthan
Agricultural production in India by commodity